

Awards

FIBA European Champions Cup Finals Top Scorer
 Dražen Petrović ( Cibona)

External links
FIBA European Champions Cup 1984–85

1984–85 in European basketball
1984–85
1985 in Greek sport
1984–85 in Yugoslav basketball
1984–85 in Spanish basketball
International basketball competitions hosted by Greece
Real Madrid Baloncesto games
Sports competitions in Piraeus